Pseudosinella spinosa is a species of slender springtails in the family Entomobryidae.

References

Collembola
Animals described in 1949